Saffron Aviation, DBA Cinnamon Air is a Sri Lankan domestic airline, operating from a dedicated terminal at the Bandaranaike International Airport, Colombo to destinations around Sri Lanka. It commenced its daily scheduled operation in July 2013. Cinnamon Air’s fleet consists of two Cessna 208 Amphibian aircraft and one wheeled Cessna 208B Grand Caravan. Saffron Aviation (Pvt) Ltd. which manages Cinnamon Air is a joint venture between John Keells Holdings PLC (JKH), MMBL Leisure Holdings (Pvt) Ltd., and Phoenix Ventures Limited.  The company slogan is Wings of Sri Lanka.

Overview

All Cinnamon Air scheduled flights operate in code share with Sri Lankan Airlines. To further its relationship with the national carrier, one of Cinnamon Air's Cessna 208 Caravan Amphibians sports a SriLankan AirTaxi livery.

Cinnamon Air, owned and operated by Saffron Aviation (Pvt) Limited, is a joint venture between Sri Lanka's largest listed conglomerate, John Keells Holdings, MMBL Leisure Holdings (a part of the Mercantile Merchant Bank Group) and Phoenix Ventures (parent of the Brandix Group, Sri Lanka's largest garment manufacturer). The airline is based out of Katunayake where it operates a dedicated domestic terminal (within the precincts of the BIA) and also has its own purpose-built hangar and maintenance facilities.

Destinations

Codeshare agreements
Cinnamon Air has a codeshare agreement with SriLankan Airlines.

Fleet

At the airline's beginning, there was a fleet of three: two Cessna 208 and one Cessna 208B Grand Caravan.

See also
 SriLankan AirTaxi
 Helitours Skylark Helicopters
 Bandaranaike International Airport
 List of airlines of Sri Lanka

References

Airlines of Sri Lanka
Airlines established in 2012
Sri Lankan companies established in 2012